Kwon Ryong-jun (born 9 October 1975) is a North Korean football manager who is last known to have managed Dandong Tengyue. Besides North Korea, he has managed in China.

Career

In 2018, Kwon was appointed manager of North Korean side April 25. In 2019, he was appointed manager of Dandong Tengyue in the Chinese fourth division, helping them achieve promotion to the Chinese third division, China League Two.

References

External links

 

1975 births
Living people
North Korean football managers
Expatriate football managers in China